Alexander Andryushkin (born c. 1964 in Tyumen, Siberia, Russia) is a drummer. His father was a violinist and a conductor in a symphony orchestra. He is influenced by Deep Purple, Sweetwater, Led Zeppelin, and Pink Floyd. From 1994 to 2006, he played drums in Egor Letov's band Grazhdanskaya Oborona. He recorded the album Dolgaya Schastlivaya Zhizn with the group and toured extensively with them in Russia, Ukraine, the United States, and Kazakhstan. With the group, he played in front of 19,000 fans in Moscow. In late 2005, he had a falling out with Grazhdanskaya Oborona members and decided to stop touring with them and quit in 2006. He was replaced by Pavel Peretolchin in 2006.

References

External links 
 

1960s births
Living people
Russian drummers
People from Tyumen
20th-century Russian musicians
20th-century Russian male musicians
20th-century drummers
21st-century Russian musicians
21st-century Russian male musicians
21st-century drummers